The 2016 Copa Libertadores de Beach Soccer was the first edition of the Copa Libertadores de Beach Soccer (known natively in Spanish as the Copa Libertadores de Futbol Playa), an annual continental beach soccer club tournament contested between the champions of the domestic leagues of South American nations who are members of CONMEBOL.

Organised by CONMEBOL and Beach Soccer Worldwide (BSWW), the competition took place in Santos, Brazil, hosted on the Praia do Gonzaga. Originally organised to take place from 6 to 11 December 2016, the event was postponed at the request of the Brazilian Football Confederation (CBF) in response to the Chapecoense plane disaster, and eventually took place in January 2017, despite being the 2016 edition of the event.

Brazilian champions Vasco da Gama won the inaugural title after beating Argentinean team Rosario Central 8–1 in the final.

Format
The tournament started with a group stage, played in a round robin format. The winners and runners-up from each group advanced to the knockout stage, in which the teams then competed in single-elimination matches, beginning with the semi-finals and ending with the final. A third-place deciding match was also contested by the losing semi-finalists. The third and fourth placed nations from each group played in a series of consolation matches to decide fifth through eighth place.

Teams
A total of nine teams entered the competition, the winners of each of the respective domestic beach soccer leagues of the members of CONMEBOL, bar Ecuador who did not submit a team.

Squads
Each team had to submit a squad of 12 players, including a minimum of two goalkeepers, at least 2 weeks before the start of the event (Regulations Article II.A).

Referees
Ten officials were appointed by CONMEBOL on 17 November 2016.

  Mariano Romo
  José Luis Mendoza
  Ivo De Moraes
  Renato de Carlos
  Juan Carlos Amaya
  Fabricio Quintero
  José Luis Martínez
  Micke Palomino
  Pablo Cadenasso
  José Gregorio Misel

Draw
The draw to split the nine teams into two groups, one of five and one of four, took place on November 26 in Luque, Paraguay at the Auditorio de la Confederación Sudamericana de Fútbol. The teams were seeded based on their national teams' final placement in the 2015 CONMEBOL Beach Soccer Championship. The representative team of the host nation, Brazil, were allocated to Group A.

Group stage

Each team earns three points for a win in regulation time, two points for a win in extra time, one point for a win in a penalty shoot-out, and no points for a defeat. The top two teams of each group advance to the semi-finals. The rankings of teams in each group are determined as follows (regulations Article XII.B):

If two or more teams are equal on the basis of the above criterion, their rankings are determined as follows:

All times were local, BRST (UTC−2)

Group A

Group B

Consolation matches
The teams finishing in third and fourth place were knocked out of title-winning contention, receding to play in consolation matches to determine 5th through 8th place in the final standings.

5th–8th place semi-finals

Seventh place play-off

Fifth place play-off

Knockout stage
The group winners and runners-up progressed to the knockout stage to continue to compete for the title.

Semi-finals

Third place play-off

Final

Awards

Final standings

Source

References

External links
Copa Libertadores Futbol Playa 2016, at Beach Soccer Worldwide
Copa Libertadores de fútbol playa Brasil 2016, at CONMEBOL (in Spanish)
Copa Libertadores 2016, at beachsoccerrussia.ru (in Russian)

2016
Euro
2017
2017 in beach soccer
January 2017 sports events in South America
2017 in South American football